Tomopterna milletihorsini, commonly known as the Mali screeching frog, is a species of frog in the family Pyxicephalidae. It is endemic to Mali where it is known from near Bamako (its type locality) and Nara. This species was transferred from Arthroleptis to Tomopterna in 2008, the old placement still being reflected in its common name.

Its habitat and ecology are unknown. Presumably it breeds by direct development and is therefore not dependent upon water for breeding. The type specimen, now lost, measured  in snout–vent length.

References

milletihorsini
Frogs of Africa
Amphibians of West Africa
Endemic fauna of Mali
Taxa named by Fernand Angel
Amphibians described in 1922
Taxonomy articles created by Polbot